The Cincinnati Times-Star was an afternoon daily newspaper in Cincinnati, Ohio, United States, from 1880 to 1958. The Northern Kentucky edition was known as The Kentucky Times-Star, and a Sunday edition was known as The Sunday Times-Star. The Times-Star was owned by the Taft family and originally edited by Charles Phelps Taft, then, by his nephew, Hulbert Taft, Sr. The Taft family's investments in news media would later grow into Taft Broadcasting, a conglomerate that owned radio, television, and entertainment properties nationwide.

History

The Times-Star first published on June 15, 1880, after the merger of The Times (founded April 25, 1840, as Spirit of the Times) and The Cincinnati Daily Star (founded in 1872 as The Evening Star). Charles Phelps Taft had purchased both papers the previous year, and named his brother, Peter Rawson Taft II, publisher.

The Times-Star strongly supported political boss George B. Cox, to the embarrassment of Charles Phelps Taft's half-brother, progressive reformer and future President William Howard Taft.

On November 23, 1895, the Times-Star ran an editorial proposing a contest to choose a flag for the City of Cincinnati, offering a $50 prize. On January 24, 1896, the commission awarded the $50 to influential illustrator Emil Rothengatter for the design that is in use today.

The newspaper's offices were originally located on Sixth and Walnut streets. On January 1, 1933, the Times-Star moved into the 16-story Cincinnati Times-Star Building on Broadway.

In 1939, the Times-Star purchased WKRC radio from CBS and subsequently became an affiliate and shareholder of the Mutual Broadcasting System through subsidiary Radio Cincinnati.

In 1952, Hulbert Taft, Sr., owner and publisher of the Times-Star, attempted to acquire The Cincinnati Enquirer from its owner, a Washington D.C.–based trust. A bidding war ensued when Enquirer employees pooled their assets in order to make a counter offer. The offer was accepted by the trust, and the attempted acquisition was unsuccessful.

On August 3, 1958, the Times-Star was sold to Scripps-Howard Newspapers, owners of The Cincinnati Post, which by then had also purchased the Enquirer. Hulbert Taft Sr. was reportedly the only family member who opposed the sale. Radio Cincinnati was reorganized as Taft Broadcasting. The Post moved into the Times-Star Building and published under the name The Cincinnati Post and Times-Star until December 31, 1974, when it reverted to The Cincinnati Post.

Notable former employees
 Edith Evans Asbury reporter for The New York Times
 Fred Burns tennis commentator
 E. A. Bushnell political cartoonist
 George Elliston journalist
 James W. Faulkner political journalist
 Haven Gillespie typesetter; later a composer and lyricist
 James Isaminger sportswriter
 Earl Lawson sportswriter
 Mayo Mohs author
 Charles Murphy sportswriter; later owner of the Chicago Cubs
 Raymond Gram Swing radio commentator

Publishers
 Peter Rawson Taft II
 Hulbert Taft Sr.
 Hulbert Taft Jr.
 David Sinton Ingalls

See also
 Cincinnati Times-Star Building

References

External links
 
 Bibliographic information at Chronicling America:
 About Spirit of the times. 1840-1841
 About The Cincinnati Daily Star. 1875-1880
 About The Times. 1879-1880
 About Cincinnati Times-Star. 1880-1887
 About The Times-Star. 1887-1893
 About The Cincinnati Times-Star. 1893-1958

Defunct newspapers published in Cincinnati
 
Newspapers established in 1880
Publications disestablished in 1958
1958 disestablishments in Ohio